Salins-Fontaine is a commune in the Savoie department of southeastern France. Established on 1 January 2016, it consists of the former communes of Salins-les-Thermes and Fontaine-le-Puits.

See also 
Communes of the Savoie department

References 

Communes of Savoie